The Food Industry Students European Council (FISEC) was the student association of the European Federation of Food Science and Technology, for students studying food science, food technology and related courses at a European university.

FISEC was a non-profit, apolitical and independent association, which tries to help students to meet and learn from one another through international events.

FISEC's roles

1. Help students to meet and in that way to become more internationally minded.

2. Create opportunities for the students to meet and learn from one another through our organized events.

3. To expand educational and job possibilities for all our members and to achieve personal development.

4. Continuous development of communication and cooperation between students, universities and companies.

Executive committee

The Executive Committee consists of a President, Vice-President, Treasurer and Secretary.

FISEC's events

FISEC is holding two annual conferences, the General Assembly and the Food Convention.

These conferences provide an excellent opportunity to meet our European counterparts and to learn more about their industries, usually by visiting food companies and talking to their representatives. At the General Assembly we also organize the necessary official parts of an association, like electing a new president.

FISEC's history

1989, May: The First Food Convention takes place at ENSIA, Massy, France.

1989, November: Starting point for the work between students of the ENSIA and the ESB, Porto, Portugal.

1990, May 5: As a result of that cooperation FISEC is founded at the ESB in Porto by the following six universities: University of Reading, UK; University of Milan, Italy; Wageningen University, Netherlands; ESB Porto, Portugal; ENSIA, Massy and ENSBANA, Dijon, France.

1991: The Technical University of Berlin joined FISEC during this year . The last General Assembly was held in Nancy, France and the Food Convention was in Brussels, Belgium. A decision was taken for the next Food Convention to be in Berlin, Germany.

Through the years sometimes the separate FISEC teams have lost traces but it never stopped functioning and the students from the various universities across Europe have found their ways to gather.

1998: FISEC's official meeting gathers many new members and a few Universities that are very active members till nowadays join the association: Croatia (Zagreb and Osijek), Portugal (Porto), Belgium (Brussels), Spain (Zaragoza), England (Reading), Hungary (Szeged), France (Nantes), Germany (Munich), Sweden(Kalmar) and Netherlands (Wageningen) are among the participants in the event.

1999: The General Assembly was held in March 1999 and the Food Convention was organized by the team of FISEC Zagreb, Croatia in October during the same year.

2000: The record is only for the Food Convention that was held in Brussels, Belgium where teams from Austria (University of Vienna) and Bulgaria (Plovdiv) joined the members of FISEC.

2001: The next two events gather even more interest. The General Assembly was organized by the team of FISEC-Berlin (Germany) and the Food Convention was in Thessaloniki (Greece) . In 2001 Universities from Romania, Slovakia and Portugal (Algarve and Faro) are among FISEC's new members.

2002: The official website of FISEC was created by Stefan Topfl - member of the Technical University of Berlin, Germany. The General Assembly was held in Plovdiv and the Food Convention in Faro, Portugal.

2003: The General Assembly has been organized in April 2003 by the FISEC team Nantes (France) and the Food Convention in the same year was voted to be in Brussels, Belgium.
During this year the first steps in FISEC's collaboration with other student's non-governmental organizations have been done by its current president Mauro Portela.

2004: General Assembly was held in Zagreb, Croatia

2005: General Assembly was held in Szeged, Hungary and Food Convention was held in Istanbul Turkey on Istanbul Technical University

2006: General Assembly was held in Plovdiv, Bulgaria and Food Convention was held in Faro, Portugal

2007: General Assembly was held in Split, Croatia.

References

European student organizations
Food technology organizations